Katherine Estrella Salosny Reyes (born 8 April 1964) is a Chilean actress and television presenter.

Early years
As a child, Katherine Salosny lived with her mother in Mendoza, Argentina. She returned to Chile in her adolescence and attended Redland School for her primary and secondary education.

Television presenter

1980s and 1990s
In 1984 Salosny was working as a supermarket promoter, when in September she was cast as the face of the "Pepsi Challenge" campaign. After her advertising debut, in March 1985 she was hired by Universidad de Chile Televisión (Channel 11, now Chilevisión), where she had her television premiere on the program Extra-mujeres, on which she had a youth segment.

Salosny's segment was so successful that it was spun off into a new program, of which she was the sole presenter until 1990, when Felipe Camiroaga joined as co-host. During those years, she was a participant in the campaign for the 1988 plebiscite, supporting the "Yes" option that proposed to keep General Augusto Pinochet in power until 1997, appearing in the  chapter corresponding to 26 September. After leaving Extra jóvenes in 1991, she moved to Televisión Nacional de Chile (TVN), appearing mainly on Ene TV and participating in some of the station's other programs.

In turn, she took charge of the show El baile.

Return to TVN
In 2007, she returned to the media as a panelist on TVN's Buenos Días a Todos and, due to her favorable reception, she was hired to present the program  in February 2008, during Bárbara Rebolledo's vacation.

In 2009, she debuted an evening program called Digan lo que digan together with the renowned psychologist Pilar Sordo, but it did not receive high ratings and was quickly canceled. Later that year, she hosted the reality show Pelotón before the departure of Karen Doggenweiler, but this lasted only a few days since Tonka Tomicic left Buenos Días a Todo to go to Canal 13.

In late 2010, Salosny had a controversial exit from the morning show, as the channel's executives decided to replace her with the model Carolina de Moras. This generated displeasure from the public, culminating in co-host Felipe Camiroaga being loudly booed at that year's Copihue de Oro awards.

One of Salosny's best-known productions is the docu-reality show . In addition, she led the talk show  together with journalist . During the first quarter of 2013, she hosted  and, once the broadcast was over, she decided to terminate her contract with TVN in order to sign a three-year contract with Mega to be the new host of that station's morning show.

Mucho gusto and Queen of Viña del Mar
On 2 May 2013, Salosny became the new host of Mega's morning show Mucho gusto, alongside Luis Jara. In 2015 she was a candidate for Queen of the Viña del Mar Festival, presenting herself as the first candidate in the history of the festival to reign with her own song, called "Mi Reina", a cumbia from the Chilean group La Mecha. The same year she won an Enersis Women's Energy Award in the Best Television Host category.

In February 2018 it was announced that her contract with Mega would not be renewed, and that month she left Mucho gusto.

Venture into late show format
In mid-April 2018, Salosny returned to TVN for the fourth time in her television career.

Acting career

In 2011, she appeared in the play Contracciones.

Activism
Salosny is a board member of the Fundación para la Confianza (Foundation for Trust) which advocates on behalf of victims of sexual abuse, including those involved in the Karadima case.

Filmography

TV programs

Telenovelas

TV series and movies

Awards
 2010 Copihue de Oro for Best Woman Television Host
 2014 Copihue de Oro for Best Woman Television Host
 2015 Copihue de Oro for Best Woman Television Host
 2015 Enersis Women's Energy Award in the Best Television Host category

References

External links

 

1964 births
21st-century Chilean actresses
Actresses from Santiago
Activists for victims of sexual abuse in the Catholic Church
Chilean activists
Chilean women activists
Chilean stage actresses
Chilean telenovela actresses
Chilean television presenters
Chilean television personalities
Living people
Chilean women television presenters